Trymalium is a genus of shrubs or trees in the family Rhamnaceae. The species are endemic to Western Australia but for one, Trymalium wayi, that occurs in South Australia. They are found in forest and semiarid woodland and shrubland of the kwongan in southwest Australia, and the outlying species of South Australia is found on rocky slopes, notably at the Mount Lofty and Flinders Ranges.

Species include:
Trymalium albicans Reisseck, endemic to Western Australia
Trymalium angustifolium Reisseck, endemic to Western Australia
Trymalium daphnifolium Reisseck, endemic to Western Australia
Trymalium densiflorum Rye, endemic to Western Australia
Trymalium elachophyllum Rye, endemic to Western Australia
Trymalium ledifolium  Fenzl., endemic to Western Australia
Trymalium litorale (Diels) Domin, endemic to Western Australia
Trymalium monospermum Rye, endemic to Western Australia
Trymalium myrtillus S.Moore, endemic to Western Australia
Trymalium odoratissimum Lindl., endemic to Western Australia
Trymalium spatulatum (Labill.) Ostenf., endemic to Western Australia
Trymalium urceolare (F.Muell.) Diels, endemic to Western Australia
Trymalium venustum Rye, endemic to Western Australia
Trymalium wayi F.Muell. & Tate, endemic to South Australia

Species names that are no longer current include:
Trymalium daltonii F.Muell. - currently Spyridium daltonii (F.Muell.) J.Kellerm.
Trymalium floribundum Steud. - currently Trymalium odoratissimum Lindl. subsp. odoratissimum
Trymalium ramosissimum Audas - currently Spyridium × ramosissimum (Audas) J.Kellerm.

References

Rhamnaceae
Rosales of Australia
Rhamnaceae genera
Taxa named by Eduard Fenzl